Felicitas of Padua is a saint in the Roman Catholic Church. She lived in the ninth century, and was a nun in Padua, probably at the convent of Saints Cosmas and Damian. Her relics are now in the Basilica of Saint Justina, Padua.

References

9th-century Christian saints
9th-century Italian  nuns
Medieval Italian saints
Female saints of medieval Italy